Bactrocera is a large genus of tephritid fruit flies, with close to 500 species currently described and accepted.

Name
The genus name is derived from Ancient Greek bakter "rod" and kera "horn".

Systematics
Prior to the 1990s, almost all Dacini species were described in the genera Dacus or Strumeta. Bactrocera became the main genus for the tribe after Bactrocera and Dacus were split, but Bactrocera was further divided into Zeugodacus and Bactrocera in 2015. The subgeneric treatments have only partly adopted this latest change, but are indicated here to reflect the most modern - DNA based - insights.

Many subgenera are defined within this genus:

Afrodacus
Aglaodacus
Apodacus
Asiadacus
Austrodacus
Bactrocera
Bulladacus
Calodacus
Daculus
Diplodacus
Gymnodacus
Hemigymnodacus
Heminotodacus
Hemiparatridacus
Hemisurstylus
Hemizeugodacus
Javadacus
Melanodacus
Neozeugodacus
Nesodacus
Niuginidacus
Notodacus
Papuodacus
Paradacus
Paratridacus
Parazeugodacus
Perkinsidacus
Queenslandacus
Semicallantra
Sinodacus
Tetradacus
Trypetidacus

See also
 List of Bactrocera species

References

Further reading
  (with key to Indian Bactrocera species) — (description of new species B. amarambalensis, B. apiconigroscutella, B. neoarecae, B. neonigrotibialis, B. paraosbeckiae, B. paraverbascifoliae, B. penecorrecta, B. pseudoversicolor, B. yercaudiae and B. binoyi)

External links
On the UF / IFAS Featured Creatures Web site
 Bactrocera correcta , guava fruit fly
 Bactrocera cucurbitae, melon fly
 Bactrocera dorsalis, oriental fruit fly
 Bactrocera oleae, olive fruit fly
 Bactrocera tryoni, Queensland fruit fly
  Bactrocera tsuneonis, Japanese orange fly

Other
fauna.org.uk

 Tephritid Workers Database

 
Dacinae
Agricultural pest insects
Tephritidae genera
Taxa named by Pierre-Justin-Marie Macquart